Alsbach is an Ortsgemeinde – a community belonging to a Verbandsgemeinde – in the Westerwaldkreis in Rhineland-Palatinate, Germany.

Geography 
The community lies in the Westerwald between Koblenz and Siegen. Fifty-four percent of the rural area is wooded. Alsbach belongs to the  Verbandsgemeinde of Ransbach-Baumbach, a kind of collective municipality.

History 
In 1143, Alsbach had its first documentary mention. From 1806 it belonged to the Duchy of Nassau. In 1866 it passed to Prussia.

Coat of arms 
The community's arms are based on those formerly borne by the Counts of Wied, Alsbach's former overlords.

Economy and infrastructure 

South of Alsbach runs the Autobahn A 48. The nearby Brexbachtalbahn (railway) is no longer in service.

References

External links 

 Alsbach 
 Alsbach in the television programme Hierzuland 

Municipalities in Rhineland-Palatinate
Westerwaldkreis